Rolf Bietmann (born 18 May 1954) is a German politician. He represents the CDU. Bietmann has served as a member of the Bundestag from the state of North Rhine-Westphalia from 2002 till 2005.

External links
 Web Archive of the German Bundestag of 15 November 2005 
 

1954 births
Living people
Members of the Bundestag for North Rhine-Westphalia
Members of the Bundestag 2002–2005
Members of the Bundestag for the Christian Democratic Union of Germany